Laura Carter (born 13 September 1985) is an English actress. In 2016, she appeared on the 17th series of Big Brother, finishing in ninth place.

Early life
Carter is from Bingley, West Yorkshire. She studied drama at Intake Performing Arts College in Leeds in 2004.

Career
Her first television credit was in 2008, in The Royal Today. She then had minor roles in the Channel 4 drama Red Riding, soap operas Emmerdale, Casualty and Holby City, and appeared in the second series of the BBC drama The Syndicate. She was then featured on the Clean & Clear idents for the E4 series 90210. She later appeared as one of the main cast in E4's Young, Free & Single.

In 2016, Carter took part in the 17th series of the Channel 5 reality series Big Brother, alongside the controversial social media influencer Andrew Tate. On Day 46, she became the eighth housemate to be evicted, meaning she had finished in ninth place. Following her appearance on Big Brother, Carter appeared on other shows such as Loose Women and Big Brother's Bit on the Side.

In 2017, Carter appeared in an episode of the BBC soap opera Doctors, portraying the role of Laura Barton. She then portrayed Anina in the 2018 film Dead Ringer, and Daisy in the 2019 film Once Upon a Time in London.

Filmography

References

External links 

1985 births
Living people
Actresses from Yorkshire
English television actresses
Big Brother (British TV series) contestants
People from Bingley
Actresses from Bradford